Ganguru is a neighbourhood of Vijayawada in Krishna district of the Indian state of Andhra Pradesh. As per the G.O. No. M.S.104 (dated:23-03-2017), Municipal Administration and Urban Development Department, it became a part of Vijayawada metropolitan area. It is located in Penamaluru mandal of Vijayawada revenue division.

References 

Neighbourhoods in Vijayawada